Could It Be Different? is the third and final studio album by Scottish band The Spook School. It was released in January 2018 by Fortuna Pop! in the UK/EU and Slumberland Records in the US.

Clash called it "arguably [...] one of the most important albums of 2018". It was long-listed for that years Scottish Album of the Year Award.

Opener Still Alive begins with a clip of English comedian Josie Long taken from her show Romance and Adventure.

Critical reception
Could It Be Different? was met with "generally favorable" reviews from critics. At Metacritic, which assigns a weighted average rating out of 100 to reviews from mainstream publications, this release received an average score of 79, based on 11 reviews. Aggregator Album of the Year gave the release a 79 out of 100 based on a critical consensus of 13 reviews.

Track listing

References

2015 albums
The Spook School albums